Gerasimos "Makis" Giatras (born August 27, 1971) is a Greek professional basketball coach, most recently having managed Promitheas Patras of the Greek Basket League and the EuroCup.

Coaching career
Giatras began his coaching career in 1996. He became the head coach of the Greek club Promitheas Patras, in 2013. With Promitheas, he won the Greek 4th Division championship in 2014, and the Greek 3rd Division championship in 2015. With him as head coach, Promitheas then earned a league promotion to Greece's 2nd Division, in 2016.

With Promitheas, he coached in Greece's 1st Division, for the first time, in the 2017–18 season. In the 2018–19 season, he coached in a European-wide competition for the first time, coaching Promitheas in the FIBA Champions League, which is one of Europe's two secondary level leagues. He was named the Greek League Coach of the Year, of the 2018–19 season.

Executive career
Giatras worked as the general manager of Promitheas, from 2016 to 2017.

References

External links
EuroCup Coach Profile
Eurobasket.com Coach Profile
Realgm.com Coach Profile
Promitheas Patras Profile 
Esperos Patras Profile 

1971 births
Living people
Doxa Lefkadas B.C. coaches
Greek basketball coaches
Greek basketball executives and administrators
Promitheas Patras B.C. coaches